Rhinoraja, commonly known as the jointnose skates, is a genus of skates in the family Arhynchobatidae. They are found in the north-western Pacific Ocean.

Species 
Currently, the genus consists of three recognized species. Other species formerly placed here have been moved to the genus Bathyraja.

 Rhinoraja kujiensis (S. Tanaka (I), 1916) (Dapple-bellied softnose skate)
 Rhinoraja longicauda Ishiyama, 1952 (White-bellied softnose skate)
 Rhinoraja odai Ishiyama, 1958 (Oda's skate)

References 
 

Rajidae
Ray genera